Interzone may refer to:

General
 International zone, such as in Tangier
 Interzone (book), the title of a short story collection by William Burroughs
Interzone, a setting in the 1959 novel Naked Lunch by William Burroughs
 Interzone (magazine), a British science fiction magazine

Music
 Interzone (band), a German blues/rock band
 "Interzone", a track on the Joy Division album Unknown Pleasures
 "Interzone", the first track on the album The Interzone Mantras by The Tea Party
 Interzone (album), an album by John Zorn

Cinema
 Interzone (film), a 1987 film directed by Deran Sarafian